Pottaveli is a village in the Ariyalur taluk of Ariyalur district, Tamil Nadu, India.

Demographics 

 census, Pottaveli had a total population of 3411 with 1637 males and 1774 females.

References 

Villages in Ariyalur district